The Capuchin Annual was an Irish annual publication published every year in Dublin by the Capuchins from 1930 to 1977.  The motto of the publication was Do chum Glóire Dé agus Onóra na hÉireann (For the Glory of God and the Honour of Ireland).  Many articles were from an Irish nationalist perspective.

History
The Annual was started by Fr Senan OFM Cap, who continued as editor for many years. It contained articles (mainly in English but also in Irish) on a variety of subjects, poetry, cartoons, illustrations and photographs. It was printed by John English of Wexford.

The cover, featuring a Capuchin friar and a dog (a young wolf), was designed by Seán O'Sullivan. The chief artist for many years was Richard King. The cartoonist from 1942 to 1955 was Charles E. Kelly.

Contributors
Among the many contributors over the years were:
An Seabhac 1941
Robert Barton on agriculture, 1935
Francis Browne contributed fifty photographs, in 1942
Stephen Brown on Medieval Literature, in 1942
Arthur C Clarke 1971
Sigerson Clifford 1940
Martin Coen 1971
J. C. Coleman on Irish caves, in 1949 
Seán Cronin on Kevin Barry in 1970
Alice Curtayne on "The Art of the Microphone" 1936 
Aodh De Blácam 1935
Frank Duff 1956-57
Gabriel Fallon on the Abbey, 1937
Desmond Fennell 1964
Aloys Fleischmann on Carl Gilbert Hardebeck, 1943 
Frank Gallagher 1931
Carl Hardebeck 1943
Benedict Kiely on Donegal, in 1944
Thomas MacGreevy, in 1942, 1949, 1950-51, 1953-54, 1958, 1960, 1963 
Kathleen M. Murphy, poetry in 1950-51 and 1959
Seán Neeson on Carl Gilbert Hardebeck, 1965
Michael O'Farrell on Achill, 1972
John D. Sheridan 1939
Annie M. P. Smithson 1944.
Francis Stuart 1944
Maurice Walsh 1931

References

External links
 Capuchin Annual 1930-1977 Digitized copies, from the Irish Capuchin Franciscans website 

Defunct magazines published in Ireland
Religious magazines
Annual magazines
Magazines established in 1930
Magazines published in Ireland
Magazines disestablished in 1977
Capuchins